Witnica  is a town in western Poland, situated in the Lubusz Voivodeship, with 6,747 inhabitants (2019).

The town is located in the historic Lubusz Land. The town's name derives from the Polish words wić or witka, meaning a willow twig or a type of willow.

History
Along with Lubusz Land it was part of medieval Poland, and later it was also under the rule of Brandenburg, the Czech Crown, Prussia, and between 1871 and 1945 it was part of Germany, located in the Prussian Province of Brandenburg. The Germans brought Polish prisoners of war for forced labour to the town during World War II. In the final stages of World War II, half of the population fled before the Red Army captured the town in February 1945. Polish POWs were liberated.

After Nazi Germany's defeat in World War II the area became again part of Poland. The remaining population was expelled in accordance to the Potsdam Agreement. New Polish citizens, mostly themselves expellées from former eastern Poland annexed by the Soviet Union, came to the town. War damage was not significant, reaching 8% of the buildings. The ruins were dismantled to obtain bricks for the reconstruction of Warsaw destroyed by the Germans.

Economy
The town is known for its brewery (Browar Witnica), established in 1848.

Culture
A Polish military museum (Muzeum Chwały Oręża Polskiego) is located in Witnica.

Sports
Witnica is home to football club , which competes in the Polish lower leagues.

Twin towns – sister cities
See twin towns of Gmina Witnica.

People 
 Johannes Schüler (1894–1966), German conductor

Gallery

References

External links
Official town webpage
Jewish Community in Witnica on Virtual Shtetl

Cities and towns in Lubusz Voivodeship
Gorzów County